The Concert for García Lorca is an album by pianist Ben Sidran featuring performances recorded in 1998 at the home of Federico García Lorca using his piano on the 100th anniversary of his birth and released on the Go Jazz label.

Reception

The Allmusic review states "This is not only a fitting tribute to Federico García Lorca, but it is also a shining, truly original portrait of a very literate jazzman who has plenty of tricks and wonders up his sleeve, more than three decades after he began. Highly recommended if you can find it".

Track listing
All compositions by Ben Sidran featuring text by Federico García Lorca except as indicated
 "On Defeating Death/Absent Soul" – 11:37
 "It Ain't Necessarily So" (George Gershwin, Ira Gershwin) – 5:02
 "On Duende" – 10:30
 "Cante Jondo and the Blues" – 11:49
 "New Gypsy Ballads: Whisper Not/Lover Man" (Benny Golson/Jimmy Davis, Ram Ramirez, James Sherman) – 6:18
 "Look Here" (Mose Allison) – 3:34
 "Poet in New York/Freedom Jazz Dance" (García Lorca, Sidran/Eddie Harris) – 8:37
 "For Margarita Xirgu" – 8:29

Personnel
Ben Sidran – piano, vocals
Bobby Martínez – tenor saxophone
Manuel Calleja – bass
Leo Sidran – drums

References

Ben Sidran albums
1998 albums